Prays omicron is a moth of the family Praydidae. It is found in Japan.

The wingspan is 9–11 mm.

References

Plutellidae
Moths of Japan
Moths described in 1977